Like a Fool may refer to:

"Like a Fool" (Dottie West song), 1967
"Like a Fool" (Robin Gibb song), 1985
"Like a Fool" (Viola Beach song), 2016
"Like a Fool", a song by Nylon Beat
"Like a Fool", a song by Shaimus
"Like a Fool", a song by Twice from The Story Begins
"Like a Fool", a song by Charlotte Church from Three